The Charlottenburg Canal, or Charlottenburger Verbindungskanal  in German, is a canal in Berlin, Germany.

The route of canal was north from the River Spree until it passed under the railway bridge carrying the Ringbahn, at which point it turned east along an alignment slightly to the south of that of the more recent Westhafen Canal. After the completion of the latter in 1956, the north–south aligned section of the Charlottenburg Canal was extended to form a right-angled junction with the Westhafen Canal, and the west to east aligned section was closed and filled in. The Berliner Großmarkt or Berlin Wholesale Market now covers the site of this section.

It has no locks.

The waterways crossroad at the southern end of the Charlottenburg Canal, where it meets both the River Spree and the Landwehr Canal, is known as Spreekreuz. Adjoining the canal near Spreekreuz is a police station of the Berlin Wasserschutzpolizei (water police).

References

Canals in Berlin
Buildings and structures in Charlottenburg-Wilmersdorf
Buildings and structures in Mitte
Federal waterways in Germany
Canals opened in 1859